Saint-Martin-d'Ardèche is a commune in the department of Ardèche in Southern France.

Saint-Martin-d'Ardèche is situated at the Southern entrance of the Ardèche Canyon, the Gorges de l'Ardèche.

Administration
Saint-Martin-d'Ardèche is member of the intercommunality of Rhône aux Gorges de l'Ardèche together with nearby Ardèche communes of Bidon, Bourg-Saint-Andéol, Gras, Larnas, Saint-Montan, Saint-Just, Saint-Marcel-d'Ardèche, Saint-Remèze and Viviers at the very south-eastern end of department.

Population

Geography
Since 1960, a panoramic road follows the canyon up the hill through the garrigue, the first Mediterranean vegetation when arriving from the North, and ends in Saint-Martin-d'Ardèche with a view on the end of the river flowing towards the Rhône in direction of the Fuji-Yama silhouette of 1900 m. high Mont Ventoux in Provence.

History
Originally a settlement of peasants, fishermen and boatmen at a ford on the river, Petra and/or Sant Martin de la Peyre (St. Martin of the rocks) belongs along the centuries to the baronets of Aiguèze, whose fortress overviewed the whole valley down to the delta of Ardèche into the Rhône, then in the duchy of Uzès. It only became a separate commune at the French Revolution, when Départements were created with the river here as borderline: Aiguèze in département Gard, Saint-Martin-de-la-Pierre as Saint-Martin-d'Ardèche in département Ardèche.

Its situation on a ford had made the village an early stop for pilgrims and travellers. A church was  built in the 11th and 12th centuries (up to the 19th-century bell tower). The river would finally be spanned by a stone bridge built in 1895 - which would be destroyed five years later by one of the furious swellings Ardèche was accustomed to after autumn rains before it would be regulated and dammed in the Cévennes. In September 1900, the bridge collapsed and was replaced in 1905 by a hanging bridge.

The economy of the village, a mainly agricultural one during the 19th and early 20th centuries (silkworms, fruit, wine, plus wood floating or charcoal transport on the river, and angling) occurred to change at the second half of the 20th century with the transformations on nearby Rhône Valley (canal on the Rhône, atomic industries in Marcoule by Bagnols-sur-Cèze and Eurodif in Pierrelatte, highway A7 from Lyon to Spain or French Riviera, TGV railways) : both arms of local economy are nowadays wine - the southern Côtes du Rhône - and tourism. Kayak and camping trips down the gorge are common in the summer. Saint-Martin-d'Ardèche, at crossroads of four départements - Ardèche, Gard, Drôme, Vaucluse - with its river beaches, canoe trips, hike and ride possibilities on hills around, plus historical townlets nearby and surrounding villages (megalithic sites with dolmens, visited caves, mediaeval chapels, Renaissance buildings), has become a touristic centre at the gateway of Provence.

Tourism
 3 hotels
 7 campsites
 several guest houses, B&B, gîtes and chambres d'hôtes
 several restaurants
 canoe and kayak rentings

Nearby sites:
 Aven d'Orgnac in Orgnac-l'Aven
 Caves like Grottes de Saint-Marcel on the Route Touristique de Gorges
 Dolmens (Champvermeil in Bidon, Pradèches in Saint-Marcel - or near the Botanic Path at the Grottes de Saint-Marcel with a menhir,...)
 Roman sites of Alba-la-Romaine, Roman bridge on the Escoutaÿ river in Viviers
 Mediaeval villages with burg ruins : Aiguèze labelled one of the "Most Beautiful Villages of France", Saint-Montan
 Mediaeval isolated church of Larnas, chapels St-Sulpice in Saint-Marcel d'Ardèche, Ste-Agnès in Saint-Paulet-de-Caisson,...
 Mediaeval and Renaissance town centers in Bourg-Saint-Andéol, Viviers see, Pont-Saint-Esprit with its 13th-century stonebridge over the Rhône at the confluence of Ardèche, Saint-Paul-Trois-Châteaux and castles of Suze-la-Rousse or Mme de Sévigné's daughter Grignan
 La Ferme aux Crocodiles in Pierrelatte

See also
Communes of the Ardèche department

References

Saintmartindardeche
Ardèche communes articles needing translation from French Wikipedia
Vivarais